The Kentucky Colonel is a 1920 American silent drama film directed by William A. Seiter and starring Joseph J. Dowling, Frederick Vroom and Elinor Field based on the 1890 best-selling book A Kentucky Colonel by Opie Read.

Cast
 Joseph J. Dowling as Colonel Remington Osbury
 Frederick Vroom as General Buck Hineman
 Elinor Field as Luzelle Hineman
 Francis McDonald as Philip Burwood
 Cora Drew as Mrs. Hineman
 Lloyd Bacon as Boyd Savely
 Jill Woodward as Ella Mayhew
 Fred Kohler as Jim Britsides
 Gordon Griffith as Sam Britsides
 Mae Talbot as Jack Gap
 Thelma Salter as Liza Ann Gap
 Ed Brady as Reverend Gardner Boyle

References

Bibliography
 Munden, Kenneth White. The American Film Institute Catalog of Motion Pictures Produced in the United States, Part 1. University of California Press, 1997.
 Singer, Michael. Film Directors: A Complete Guide. Watson-Guptill Publications, Incorporated, 1993.

External links
 

1920 films
1920 drama films
1920s English-language films
American silent feature films
Silent American drama films
American black-and-white films
Films directed by William A. Seiter
Films distributed by W. W. Hodkinson Corporation
1920s American films